The Parti Ikatan Bangsa Malaysia is a political party in Malaysia formed on 7 June 2012 by the former United Malays National Organisation (UMNO) cabinet minister and veteran, Abdul Kadir Sheikh Fadzir along with a few former UMNO members. The party was forced to wait for more than two years for approval from the Registrar of Societies (RoS). In February 2013, Abdul Kadir dragged the RoS to High Court for them to approve the party. The party was later approved on 15 May 2015.

The party intends to bring the original ideas and politics principles of Tunku Abdul Rahman, the first Malaysian Prime Minister and Father of Independence. The party said that they are not pro-government nor pro-opposition.

In 2016 IKATAN however together with opposition Pan-Malaysian Islamic Party (PAS) formed Gagasan Sejahtera (GS), an informal political Third Force alliance. Joined later by Pan-Malaysian Islamic Front (BERJASA), the three opposition parties under GS alliance contested using PAS logo in the 2018 general elections (GE14), including IKATAN  in some 'unwinnable' non-Muslim seats. IKATAN failed to win a single state or parliamentary seat in the seats it had contested with only PAS managed to win seats in the election, securing 18.. The party is currently unrepresented in the Dewan Rakyat and in all of the state legislative assemblies.

On 26 October 2022, IKATAN chose to support BN. IKATAN's Head of Information, Nik Marhalim Mohd Bakri, said in the spirit of ummah unification, then IKATAN chose to support BN in GE-15.

Structure and membership

Current office bearers 
 President:
 Abdul Kadir Sheikh Fadzir
 Deputy President:
 Abdul Aziz Sheikh Fadzir
 Vice-President:
 Tunku Muinuddin Putra
 Mohamad Badri Abd Rahman
 Secretary-General:
 Tengku Ahmad Mudzaffar Bin Tengku Zaid
 Treasurer:
 David Sew Kah Heng
 Information Chief:
 Nik Marhalim Dato' Mohd Bakri
 Strategy Director:
 Azahari Ab Rahman
 Youth Chief:
 Shahir Adnan
 Central Working Committee:
 Kelly Lim
 Janice Lim
 Nik Marhalim
 Founding member
 Dato Tony Looi

General election results

See also 
 List of political parties in Malaysia
 Politics of Malaysia
 Gagasan Sejahtera
 2018 Malaysian general election

Notes

References

External links
  
 

Political parties in Malaysia
Political parties established in 2012
2012 establishments in Malaysia